Foad Rafii M.Arch.  Architect AAA, AIBC. FRAIC (born March 8, 1947) is a Canadian architect.

In 2001, The Vancouver Sun in a headline article, named Foad Rafii as one of the 10 architects who shaped the Vancouver of today.

In early 2014 Foad Rafii was elected to Fellowship in the College of Fellows of the Royal Architectural Institute of Canada.

Education
Foad is a graduate of Alborz High School (Old American College) in Tehran, who received his master's degree in architecture with Distinction from the University of Tehran, School of Architecture in 1972.

In 1976, he attended the University of Oslo, and completed a course in "Urban and Regional Planning and Environment Protection".

In 1987, he completed work on "Urban Waterfront Development" at the Harvard Graduate School of Design.

Career
In 1973 together with some colleague friends he started the consulting firm ORBIS Institute for Environmental Design, Foad being the Managing Director.

While practicing in Tehran, in addition to multiple residential projects, he worked on two major department stores and a few hospitals.

Foad moved to Vancouver in 1979, and after working for an architectural firm for a couple of years, established his practice in 1983. The name of the practice was changed to Rafii Architects in 1985.

In more than a quarter century, Rafii Architects has designed numerous major projects in Vancouver, the rest of British Columbia, Alberta, and some projects abroad.

"The Greater Vancouver Book", an urban encyclopedia- The year 1997- notes:
Iranian Architects like Foad Rafii, who designed the first buildings constructed on the North shore of False Creek after Expo 86 and the new mixed use Woodward's building Downtown, have made and are continuing to make a significant impact on the changing face of Vancouver.
The Woodward's Building project was abandoned later, as a result of the sale of the property from the province of British Columbia to the City of Vancouver.

In fall 2009 an article published in Canadian Builders Quarterly, focused on "Vancouverism" quotes Foad Rafii as an Architect who shares a significant role in this movement.

Award winning projects
 Texo, Distinguished Building Award - Spring (building) Condominiums - Austin - Texas - 2010
 Georgie Award - Gold - For Best Multifamily High Rise – Donovan Residential Tower - Vancouver - 2009
 UDI Award - For Best Residential High Rise – Pomaria Tower - Vancouver - 2007
 CARE Gold Project of the Year Award - Coniston + Stonecroft Low Rise Residentials - Nanaimo – 2001
 Georgie Award - Gold - Best Multifamily Low Rise – 18 trees - Burnaby - 2000
 British Columbia Heritage Award – Camelia Residential Tower - North Vancouver - 1993

See also
 The Story of Woodward's Building- City of Vancouver Website - Downtown Eastside Plan
Spring (building) Austin's First Point Tower - Spring's official Website -

References

External links
 Rafii Architects Inc

Living people
1947 births
Canadian architects
Academic staff of the University of Tehran
University of Tehran alumni
Canadian people of Iranian descent
Alborz High School alumni
People from Vancouver